Kimaragang (Marigang), Tobilung, and Rungus are varieties of a single Austronesian language of Sabah, Malaysia. The three varieties share moderate mutual intelligibility. Children are not learning it well in some areas.

Minokok is an endonym of the Sugut Dusun. Their language may be a dialect of Rungus. Their number are not included in the population estimate at right.

References

External links
Kimaragang Language and Culture
Rungus Dictionary on Webonary.org - dictionary by SIL International

Dusunic languages
Languages of Malaysia